U-Right International Holdings Limited, or U-Right, was a garment distributor and retailer headquartered in Hong Kong. It offered men's and ladies' casual wear under the brand name of U-Right through retail outlets and distribution points. It utilized and licensed the Swedish Texcote technology, which is a material processing technology based on the principles of nano-technology. It also had its own production base in Shunde and Shenzhen of Guangdong to develop its nano-technology products.

History
U-Right was founded by Mr. Leung Ngok in Hong Kong in 1983 and Mr. Leung served as the company chairman until 2008.

In 2008, U-Right was liquidated by Deutsche Bank, its creditor, as HK$1.3 billion debts was disabled to pay back. And provisional liquidator took over U-Right. Retail stores were closed down and 160 employees were laid off. Mr. Leung, U-Right's former chairman, was also declared bankrupt by the Hong Kong High Court. Its shares still suspended trading until further notice.

References

External links

Provisional Liquidators of U-Right International Holdings Limited

Companies listed on the Hong Kong Stock Exchange
Retail companies established in 1983
Companies disestablished in 2008
Clothing companies of Hong Kong
Clothing brands of Hong Kong
Defunct companies of Hong Kong
Clothing retailers of Hong Kong